Trichestola guatemalana is a species of beetle in the family Cerambycidae, and the only species in the genus Trichestola. It was described by Breuning in 1950.

References

Desmiphorini
Beetles described in 1950
Monotypic beetle genera